Dmitriy Vyacheslavovich Klokov (born February 18, 1983) is a Russian former Olympic weightlifter, and World Champion. He competed in the 105 kg category.

Biography

Klokov was born in Balashikha, the son of Vyacheslav Klokov, who was a world champion in the heavyweight category.

Klokov became world champion at the 2005 World Championships, with a total of 419 kg.
 He also participated in the 2005 and 2006 Arnold Sports Festivals in Columbus, Ohio. At the 2006 World Championships and 2007 World Championships he ranked 3rd.

Klokov won the silver medal at the 2008 Summer Olympics, with a total of 423 kg. He won the silver medal at the 2011 World Weightlifting Championships, with a 196 kg snatch, 232 kg clean and jerk for a total of 428 kg at a body weight of 104.6 kg. He lost to a fellow Russian, Khadzhimurat Akkayev by 2 kilos (on the snatch). Klokov was scheduled to compete at the 2012 Summer Olympics in the 105 kg class but was forced to withdraw due to undisclosed medical reasons.

In May 2015, Klokov announced his retirement from international competition. Klokov recently signed with the Baltimore Anthem of the National Pro Grid League.

In 2020, Klokov received retrospective doping charges from the International Testing Agency, for historic doping offences during his competitive weightlifting career.

Personal life
Klokov and his wife, Elena Klokova, have a daughter named Anastasia.

Major results

References

1983 births
Living people
World Weightlifting Championships medalists
People from Balashikha
Russian male weightlifters
Weightlifters at the 2008 Summer Olympics
Olympic weightlifters of Russia
Olympic silver medalists for Russia
Olympic medalists in weightlifting
Medalists at the 2008 Summer Olympics
European Weightlifting Championships medalists
Sportspeople from Moscow Oblast
20th-century Russian people
21st-century Russian people